The Borden Buildings are two buildings located at 563 Spadina Crescent and 487 Spadina Crescent in Toronto, Ontario, Canada. They were once home to dairy operations and now are used by the University of Toronto.

The buildings were also referred to as City Dairy Stables and are now known as Borden Building South (487 Spadina Cr) and Borden Building North (563 Spadina Cr).

References

University of Toronto buildings
Industrial buildings completed in 1909
Dairy farming in Canada
Dairy buildings